The Lockheed-Detroit YP-24 was a 1930s prototype two-seat fighter aircraft produced by Detroit Lockheed. An attack version called the A-9 was also proposed. The YP-24 is most remarkable for being the first fighter aircraft to bear the Lockheed name.

Design and development
In 1930, Detroit Aircraft Corporation undertook a private venture to develop a new fighter ("pursuit aircraft" in contemporary terminology) for US Army Air Corps based on the successful Lockheed Altair transport plane. Designed by Robert J. Woods, the aircraft was completed in 1931 with Detroit Aircraft fabricating the metal fuselage and Lockheed providing the wooden wings, essentially identical to the Altair. Wright Field assigned the prototype the designation XP-900. Vance Breese was hired to be the chief test pilot for the project. The aircraft was purchased by USAAC in September 1931 and redesignated YP-24, serial number 32-320. Early testing was sufficiently impressive to generate an order for five Y1P-24 fighters and four Y1A-9 attack aircraft intended to replace the Berliner-Joyce P-16. The A-9 differed in having four forward-firing machine guns, underwing racks for bombs, and a V-1570-27 engine better low-altitude performance.

Operational history

On 19 October 1931, the sole aircraft crashed. The aircraft had a partially stuck landing gear, and Wright Field pilots painted messages on the side of their P-12D and O-25C aircraft, indicating to test pilot Lt. Harrison Crocker to bail out.

Shortly after, in October 1931, events in the Great Depression forced Detroit Aircraft into bankruptcy  with Lockheed following suit in June 1932. Although Lockheed was resuscitated by a group of investors only five days after it closed doors, the financial hardships had taken their toll and the P-24/A-9 project was cancelled with no aircraft built beyond the original prototype. Four pre-production Y1P-24s, 32-321/324, were cancelled. However, after Robert Woods left Detroit Aircraft for Consolidated Aircraft, he continued to develop the YP-24/A-9 concept into Consolidated Y1P-25/Y1A-11 which eventually entered service as Consolidated P-30.

Specifications (YP-24)

See also

References

Citations

Bibliography

 Andrade, John M. U.S. Military Aircraft Designations and Serials since 1909. Earl Shilton, Leicester, UK: Midland Counties Publications, 1979. . 
 Bowers, Peter M. and Enzo Angellucci. The American Fighter. New York: Orion Books, 1987. .
 Francillon, René J. Lockheed Aircraft Since 1913. London: Putnam, 1982. .
 Francillon, René J. Lockheed Aircraft Since 1913. Annapolis, Maryland: Naval Institute Press, 1987. .
 Swanborough, Gordon and Peter M. Bowers. United States Military Aircraft Since 1909. Washington, DC: Smithsonian Publications, 1989. .

External links

 USAF Museum page on P-24/A-9

Detroit Aircraft Corporation aircraft
Lockheed P-24
Lockheed P-24
Single-engined tractor aircraft
Low-wing aircraft
Aircraft first flown in 1931